Simon Magnus Dahlbäck Granbom (born 2 July 1993) is a Swedish curler from Gävle. He currently skips a team on the World Curling Tour.

Career
Granbom is a two-time Swedish junior champion, playing third for Team Fredrik Nyman.

After juniors, Granbom joined the Jon Melin rink as his second for the 2016-17 season, and then as third for 2017-18. The team won a bronze medal at the 2017 and 2018 Swedish Men's Curling Championship. In 2018, he joined the Cameron Bryce rink at third when Bryce played out of Sweden. Granbom won another bronze at the Swedish championships in 2019 as a member of Team Bryce. As a member of this team, Granbom won his first World Curling Tour event, the 2018 Prague Classic.

In 2019, Granbom formed his own rink as skip, with a team consisting of Fabian Wingfors, Axel Sjöberg and Jacob Hanna. The team won their first tour event at the 2020 Match Town Trophy. In 2021 they defended their title.

In mixed doubles curling, Granbom won the 2019 Bele Wranå Memorial World Curling Tour event with partner Isabell Andersson.

References

External links

Living people
1993 births
Swedish male curlers
People from Gävle